Mühldorf is a Landkreis (district) in Upper Bavaria, Germany. It is bounded by (from the north and clockwise) the districts of Landshut, Rottal-Inn, Altötting, Traunstein, Rosenheim, Ebersberg and Erding.

History
Most parts of the district have belonged to Bavaria from the 13th century on. The archbishopric of Salzburg possessed some estates in the region as well from the year 798. In 1803, when the clerical states of Holy Empire were dissolved, Bavaria annexed these estates.

Geography
The district is located in generally plain countryside on either bank of the river Inn.

Coat of arms
The coat of arms displays:
 the heraldic lion of Salzburg
 the heraldic lion of the Electorate of the Palatinate

Towns and municipalities

References

Bibliography
Freed, John B. Noble Bondsmen: Ministerial Marriages in the Archdiocese of Salzburg,
1100-1343. (Ithaca, NY: Cornell University Press, 1995).

External links

 Official website (German)

 
Districts of Bavaria